In Ohio, State Route 77 may refer to:
Interstate 77 in Ohio, the only Ohio highway numbered 77 since about 1962
Ohio State Route 77 (1923), now SR 60 (Marietta to near Millersburg) and SR 754 (near Millersburg to near Shreve)